The 1916 United States presidential election in West Virginia  took place on November 7, 1916, as part of the 1916 United States presidential election which was held throughout all contemporary 48 states. Voters chose eight representatives, or electors to the Electoral College, who voted for president and vice president. 

West Virginia was won by the Republican nominee, U.S. Supreme Court Justice Charles Evans Hughes of New York, and his running mate Senator Charles W. Fairbanks of Indiana. Hughes and Fairbanks defeated the Democratic nominees, incumbent Democratic President Woodrow Wilson and Vice President Thomas R. Marshall. 

Voters in West Virginia chose each of the eight electors individually, rather than how voters in most other states selected between two full slates of electors all pledging support for one candidate or the other. Hughes won the Mountain State by a very narrow margin of 0.94% — the state's second-closest presidential election result in history, only behind Grover Cleveland's 0.32% victory in 1888 — but one elector pledged for Wilson won, and as a result, Wilson received one electoral vote from West Virginia.

Notably, this was the only time until 2008 that a Democrat won the presidency without carrying West Virginia (or that a losing Republican would carry the state). The state would transform into a Democratic stronghold after 1932, remaining a cornerstone of the Democratic coalition until the 21st century, when it suddenly and dramatically shifted towards the Republican Party due to declining unionization and opposition to the Democratic Party’s views on environmental, social and cultural issues.

Results

Results by county

Notes

References 

West Virginia
1916
1916 West Virginia elections